Victor Yerrid (born November 13, 1971) is an American actor and puppeteer for the Jim Henson Company and has performed Muppet characters in many films, television commercials and television shows. He is best known in the Muppet World for his work on the online series Statler and Waldorf: From the Balcony, in which he performed Waldorf along with an assortment of other characters.

Yerrid is also a lead performer of the Jim Henson Company's Puppet Up! improv show and is currently working on The Skrumps for the company as well. He also was a lead puppeteer on the shows Crank Yankers and Greg the Bunny.

Credits
 The Sam Plenty Cavalcade of Action Show Plus Singing: actor (Bob Choppy)
 Bear in the Big Blue House: puppeteer (Cousin Whiner and others)
 The Thundermans: puppeteer
 Sesame Street: staff and puppeteer
 Crank Yankers: puppeteer
 Robot Chicken: voices (Boo-Boo Bear, Tony the Tiger, Kermit the Frog, Miss Piggy, Howard Stern, Swedish Chef, Jack Skellington, Snagglepuss, Rod Serling, Dynomutt, Apu Nahasapeemapetilon, Hannibal, Danny Ocean, Number 5, Various)
 Mad: voices (Miss Piggy, Fozzie Bear, Waldorf, Master Roshi, Star-Lord, Ernie)
 Greg the Bunny: puppeteer (Tardy Turtle, Cranky and others)
 Angel: Polo in "Smile Time"
 Weezer's music video for "Keep Fishin'": puppeteer (Dr. Bunsen Honeydew)
 The Book of Pooh:  puppeteer (Owl)
 Between the Lions: puppeteer
 Statler and Waldorf: From the Balcony: puppeteer (Waldorf, Dr. Teeth, Larry, Lester Possum, Loni Dunne, Louie, and others) 
 Sid the Science Kid: voices (Gerald and Mort)
 Farscape: The Peacekeeper Wars: puppeteer (Bishan)
 The Producers: Lead Puppeteer (pigeons)
 MuppetFest: puppeteer
 Pajanimals: Squacky
 Disney Cruise Lines: puppeteer (Waldorf, Miss Piggy, Fozzie Bear and Sweetums)
 Drawn Together: voice (Blind kid in "Clum Babies")
 Men in Black II: puppeteer
 Puppet Up!: puppeteer
 The Skrumps: puppeteer
 Late Night Liars: puppeteer and voice (The Weasel)
 Muppets from Space: shipping coordinator
 Hannah Montana: actor (Pancake Buffalo)
 The Happytime Murders: Larry Shenanigans Philips
 The Dark Crystal: Age of Resistance: Hup the Podling

References

External links
 Official site
 The Muppet Newsflash's Interview with Victor Yerrid
 Puppet Up! Uncensored The Sydney Morning Herald
 Naughty Muppets offend and charm in Irvine The Orange County Register

Place of birth missing (living people)
Living people
Muppet performers
Sesame Street Muppeteers
American puppeteers
1956 births
American male voice actors